Cedric Donald Atkins (September 7, 1913 – June 3, 2000) was a researcher for the United States Department of Agriculture (USDA). With Edwin L. Moore and Louis G. MacDowell in the 1940s, he helped develop a new process for making concentrated orange juice. All three men were inducted together into the Florida Agricultural Hall of Fame in 1986 for their contributions to the Citrus Industry.

Early life and education
The only child of James H. Atkins, a railroad telegraph operator, and his wife Christina, an elementary school teacher, Cedric Donald "C.D." Atkins was born in Winter Haven, Florida.  He enrolled at the University of Florida, where he became an Agriculture major and joined the Alpha Gamma Rho Agricultural Fraternity.  He soon transferred to Florida Southern College in Lakeland, Florida, from which he graduated with a Bachelor of Science degree in 1937.

Career

After graduating from Florida Southern, he became a teacher and football coach at several area schools.  Atkins was then hired by the USDA as a research scientist.

Atkins died in his hometown of Winter Haven in June 2000 at the age of 86.

References

External links
Prominent UF alumni list

American food scientists
People from Winter Haven, Florida
University of Florida College of Agricultural and Life Sciences alumni
Florida Southern College alumni
1913 births
2000 deaths